Josh Chudleigh (born 8 April 1994) is an Australian professional rugby league footballer who plays for the Townsville Blackhawks in the Queensland Cup.

Background
Born in Canberra, Australian Capital Territory, Chudleigh played his junior rugby league for the Bungendore Tigers before being signed by the Canberra Raiders.

Playing career

Early career
In 2010, Chudleigh played for the Raiders' Harold Matthews Cup side. In 2012, he played for their SG Ball Cup side, scoring a try in that season's Grand Final, which they lost to the Balmain Tigers. In 2013, after taking an extended break from rugby league, Chudleigh joined the Queanbeyan Blues in the Canberra Rugby League competition after being coaxed back to the sport by former Raiders' captain and then-Queanbeyan coach Simon Woolford. In October 2013, he signed a one-year contract with the North Queensland Cowboys, joining their NYC side. He played 22 games for them in 2014, winning the club's NYC Player of the Year award, being named in the Junior Kangaroos train-on squad and earning an NRL contract.

In 2015, Chudleigh spent the year in the Queensland Cup with the Cowboys' feeder side, the Mackay Cutters. He was named at hooker in the Queensland Cup Team of the Year. In September 2015, he re-signed with the Cowboys for a further year.

2016
In Round 18 of the 2016 NRL season, Chudleigh made his NRL debut for the Cowboys against his former club, the Canberra Raiders, scoring a try. On 22 August, Chudleigh re-signed with the Cowboys for a further 2 seasons, until the end of 2018.

On 31 August, Chudleigh won the Courier Mail Medal for Queensland Cup Player of the Year and was named at hooker in the Team of the Year.

In December 2016, Chudleigh ruptured his anterior cruciate ligament (ACL) in training, ruling him out for the 2017 season.

2018
In Round 2 of the Queensland Cup season, Chudleigh made a successful return from injury in the Mackay Cutters' 26-24 loss to the Easts Tigers.

Two weeks after his return, in a game against the Northern Pride, he ruptured his ACL for the second time, ruling him out for the remainder of the 2018 season.

On 13 September 2018, he was announced by the Cowboys as one of nine players leaving the club at the end of the 2018 season.

2019
In 2019, Chudleigh joined the Townsville Blackhawks for the 2019 season.

Achievements and accolades

Individual
Courier Mail Medal: 2016
Queensland Cup Team of the Year: 2015, 2016 
North Queensland Cowboys NYC Player of the Year: 2014

Statistics

NRL
 Statistics are correct to the end of the 2018 season

References

External links
North Queensland Cowboys profile
NRL profile

1994 births
Living people
Australian rugby league players
North Queensland Cowboys players
Mackay Cutters players
Rugby league hookers
Rugby league players from Canberra
Townsville Blackhawks players